The 2010 Victoria Cup took place during June and July 2010, and was the inaugural Victoria Cup with the national teams from Zimbabwe, Kenya and Uganda competing in a round robin tournament, with both home and away fixtures. Kenya was declared the winner after winning all 4 of its matches.

Schedule 

Click on the date in the first column to see more details on that match.

2010 Final Table of Standings

2010 points scorers

Match 1: Kenya v Zimbabwe 
The Kenya head coach Michael "Tank" Otieno is an ex-Kenyan international who had played against Zimbabwe four times in his career and lost each time (1981, 1985, 1987 and 1989). The captain, Innocent Simiyu, had previously played Zimbabwe twice and won each time (2002 and 2003). Though the last match between the two sides was won by Zimbabwe these results describe the changing relative strengths of the two sides over the past 30 years, Kenya are stronger than they were though in truth the greater part of this change is a lowering of the standard of the game in Zimbabwe.

The Kenya squad included two new caps in the youngsters from the Kenya Harlequins club, David Ambunya and Patrice "Situational" Agunda. This was the first Kenyan international match that involved a decision from a Television Match Official (TMO); early in the second half, Zimbabwe crossed the Kenyan line but the referee was unsighted and sent the decision upstairs. The TMO ruled that the Zimbabwean ball carrier had been held up so the try was not awarded. The sables were leading 3-7 at half time. This defeat ended a four-match winning run for Zimbabwe, though it was their third successive away defeat by Kenya.

Match 2: Uganda v Zimbabwe 
Sables' coach Brandon Dawson expressed displeasure at the referees' handled of both this and the Kenya game the previous week, stating that the quality of officiating is negatively impacting the development of the game in Africa. The match generated further press coverage when the Sables’ team manager Noddy Kanyangarara was accused of slapping the Ugandan liaison officer Chris Lubanga during an incident in which the Zimbabweans had complained about being booked into sub-standard accommodation. Lubanga is reported to have opened a case of assault at the Kira road police station.

However Dawson conceded that Zimbabwe can only focus on their own game and simply need to put these events and the two defeats behind them and move on. Kanyangarara said that the Zimbabwe team had wasted the few chances they had in the game, whereas Uganda had made the most of theirs.

Match 3: Uganda v Kenya 

Prior to this match, Kenya were 41st on the IRB World rankings and 5th in Africa with 50.10 points, just a position and 0.01 points ahead of Uganda. The Kenyan victory earned them 0.30 points and a climb of 3 places to 38th, one shy of their best ever position since the World Rankings were introduced in October 2003. Uganda dropped to 43rd with 48.79 IRB points.

In the 2009 Elgon Cup, Uganda beat Kenya by 18-13 in Kampala but lost in Nairobi by 30-22, as holders, the Kenyans retained the trophy for a third consecutive year having won the cup in 2008. Kenya selected two international debutants to the replacements bench, Kevin Umbuge (scrum-half Impala RFC) and Felix Wanjala (lock/back-row Mean Machine RFC). Uganda selected Scot Oluoch and ex-captain John Musoke in their squad; Musoke missed the Zimbabwe game through commitments with the Uganda 7's team and Oluoch had been injured. Denis Etuket and Steven Ogwete were left out as a result. The match was televised live around the world on SuperSport 9 and, at their request, kickoff was moved forward from 16:30hrs to 16:00hrs due to the possibility of failing daylight affecting the quality of their feed towards the end of the match. This television coverage allowed for the use of a Television Match Official (TMO), the first occurrence of a TMO in Uganda, though his services were not required by the referee during the match.

The match was preceded on the same ground by the women's Elgon Cup match between Uganda and Kenya, Uganda winning 8 - 5.

Match 4: Kenya v Uganda 
By winning this match Kenya retained the Elgon Cup and secured the inaugural Victoria Cup for themselves; even if Zimbabwe were to earn the maximum ten points from their remaining two fixtures they could not overtake Kenya. Kenya rose three places in the IRB rankings to 35th (51.40 points) whilst Uganda dropped to 44th with 48.79 points. This match was preceded by a women's match between the two countries; Kenya women beat Uganda's Lady Cranes by 16 points to 8 meaning that they also secured the women's Elgon Cup.

This match took place in Nairobi on the day before the July 2010 Kampala attacks which killed and injured many people at Uganda's home ground. There were no reported deaths from the rugby team (as of 15 July 2010); some of the players that had returned from the trip were at the club but preferred to sit upstairs in the members bar and escaped the full force of the explosion.

Match 5: Zimbabwe v Kenya 
Zimbabwe were without most of their South Africa-based players due to club rugby commitments, the exceptions being Rocky Gurumani and Vakai Hove. Having lost both matches in the Victoria Cup so far, motivation is low and problems have been simmering in the Sables camp. Only 17 players turned up for the Wednesday evening training session prior to this match out of a 30 called up. There were also reports of an argument between Themba Sibanda (the Zimbabwe Rugby Union president) and head coach Brendan Dawson during a meeting between the technical team and the union’s leadership on the Wednesday prior to the match; although neither spoke publicly about the row. Union vice president Judith Chiyangwa was also reported to have walked out as tensions mounted

This was Kenya’s fourth victory against Zimbabwe in their 12 international encounters, although it the first time that Zimbabwe have lost to Kenya at home.

Match 6: Zimbabwe v Uganda 
The final match of the series was due to be played at 16:00 CAT (UTC+2) on 2010-07-24 at Harare Sports Club, Harare, Zimbabwe between Zimbabwe (51st 46.15) and Uganda (44th 48.13). Following the terrorist incident at Uganda's home ground, the Kyadondo Rugby Club, in Kampala the day after their last game against Kenya in Nairobi it was decided to cancel the match.

The game would have served little purpose in the competition other than to determine second and third place as Kenya had already secured the cup. It may have affected world rankings and would have been good experience for both teams but the Uganda Rugby Union said that "a significant number of their players were at the rugby club" at the time of the blast, and as a result the Ugandans have asked that the match be cancelled.

The referee was to have been Marius Jonker (South Africa)

References 

2010
2010 in African rugby union
2010 rugby union tournaments for national teams
2010 in Kenyan sport
2010 in Ugandan sport
2010 in Zimbabwean sport